Alexey Grigoryevich Dolgorukov (died 1734 in Beryozov) was a Russian politician and member of the Supreme Privy Council under Peter II. He is a cousin of Vasily Lukich Dolgorukov.

Biography
Dolgorukov's birth date is unknown. From 1700 to 1706 he lived in Warsaw and travelled to Italy. 

The nobility of his father Grigory Fyodorovich and uncle Yakov Fyodorovich made it quite easily for Alexey to work on different services. In 1713 he became governor of Smolensk, in 1723 president of the Main Municipality and in 1726, after an appeal by Alexander Danilovich Menshikov, was named senator and hofmeister by Catherine I. Dolgorukov was the second educator of Grand Duke Peter Alexeyevich Romanov.

Under Peter II Dolgorukov became a member of the Supreme Privy Council.

He tried to recover Peter II's rule while being against Menshikov. Finally, latter was exiled in Beryozov of the Tobolsk Governorate.

As he endeavoured to go by Peter II, he distracted him from works, encouraging him in chases and other enjoyments. He often sent him to his manor in the region behind Moscow in Gorenky, where only family members of the Dolgorukovs were near him. Here the 14-year-old Emperor met with one of Alexey's daughters, Ekaterina, who became engaged with Peter II.

After the death of Peter II, he was the only member of the Supreme Privy Council who protested against the accession of Anna, leading him and his family being exiled to Beryozov, where he died in 1734.

Personal life
His father, Grigory Fyodorovich (1657 – 1723), was house stolnik of Peter I. His mother, Praskovya Yuryevna Khilkova, was the daughter of Yuri Yakovlevich Khilkov (1682 – 1730) and Yevdokia Petrovna Neledinskaya. Alexey's children were: 
Ivan (1708 – 1739): favorite of Emperor Peter II, capitally punished. From 1730 was in marriage with countess Natalya Borisovna Sheremetyeva;
Екатерина (1712 – 1747): fiancée of Emperor Peter II. From 1745 wife of count Alexander Romanovich Bryus (Bruce);
Nikolay (1713 – 1790): in first marriage with Natalya Sergeyevna Golitsyna (1715 – 1755), in second marriage with Anna Aleksandrovna Bredikhina (1733 – 1808);
Elena (1715 – 1799): in marriage with knyaz Yuri Yuryevich Dolgorukov (died 1746);
Anna (died 1758);
Alexey (1716 – 1792): in first marriage with Yevdokia Grigoryevna Myshetskova from 1756 (died 1760). Perhaps there were two more marriages. Son: Grigory Alekseyevich Dolgorukov;
Alexander (1717 – 1782): in marriage with Praskovya Kirillovna Matyushkina (1722 – 1760).

References

External links 
 Dolgorukov knyazes. First branch

Alexey Grigoryevich
1734 deaths
Members of the Supreme Privy Council
Year of birth missing